Snaring Mountain is the highest mountain in the Victoria Cross Ranges of Alberta, Canada. The peak was named for a local Indian tribe who used snares to trap small animals; the name became official in 1934.

References

Two-thousanders of Alberta
Alberta's Rockies